The Paris Photo–Aperture Foundation PhotoBook Awards is a yearly photography book award that is given jointly by Paris Photo and Aperture Foundation. It is announced at the Paris Photo fair and was established in 2012. The categories are First PhotoBook (with a $10,000  prize), Photography Catalogue of the Year, and PhotoBook of the Year.

The shortlisted books are displayed at Paris Photo and then tour to Aperture Gallery in New York and venues elsewhere (in 2013 they toured to Denmark, Ireland, Finland and Cincinnati, OH).

PhotoBook of the Year winners

2012: City Diary (Volumes 1–3) by Anders Petersen (Steidl, 2012).
2013: A01 [COD.19.1.1.43] — A27 [S | COD.23] by Rosângela Rennó (RR Edições, 2013). Special jury recognition was awarded to War/Photography: Images of Armed Conflict and Its Aftermath, edited by Anne Wilkes Tucker and Will Michels with Natalie Zelt (Museum of Fine Arts, Houston/Yale University Press, 2012).
2014: Imaginary Club by Oliver Sieber (Editions GwinZegal/BöhmKobayashi, 2013). Special mention was awarded to Photographs for Documents by Vytautas V. Stanionis (Kaunas Photography Gallery, 2013).
2015: Illustrated People by Thomas Mailaender (Archive of Modern Conflict/RVB Books, 2015). Special Jurors’ Mention was awarded to Deadline by Will Steacy (b.frank books, 2015).
2016: ZZYZX by Gregory Halpern (Mack, 2016). Special Jurors’ Mention was awarded to Taking Stock of Power: An Other View of the Berlin Wall by Annett Gröschner and Arwed Messmer (Hatje Cantz, 2016).
2017: Museum Bhavan by Dayanita Singh (Steidl, 2017). Special Jurors’ Mention was awarded to La Grieta (The Crack) by Carlos Spottorno and Guillermo Abril (Astiberri Ediciones, 2016).
2018: On Abortion by Laia Abril (Dewi Lewis Publishing, 2017).
2019: The Coast by Sohrab Hura (UGLY DOG [self-published], 2019).
2020: Woman Go No’Gree by Gloria Oyarzabal (Editorial RM and Images Vevey, 2020).
2021: The Banda Journal by Muhammad Faldi and Fatris MF (Jordan, jordan Édition, Jakarta, Indonesia).

First PhotoBook winners

2012: Concresco by David Galjaard (Self-published, 2012).
2013: KARMA by Óscar Monzón (RVB/Dalpine, 2013).
2014: Hidden Islam by Nicolò Degiorgis (Rorhof, 2014).
2015: You Haven’t Seen Their Faces by Daniel Mayrit (Riot, 2015).
2016: Libyan Sugar by Michael Christopher Brown (Twin Palms, 2016).
2017: Monsanto: A Photographic Investigation by Mathieu Asselin (Kettler, 2017).
2018: One Wall a Web by Stanley Wolukau-Wanambwa (Roma, 2018). Special Jurors’ Mention was awarded to Experimental Relationship Vol. 1 by Pixy Liao (Jiazazhi, 2018).
2019: The Eighth Day by Gao Shan (Imageless, 2019).
Special Jurors' Mention was awarded to This World and Others Like It (Fw and Yoffy, 2019).
2020: Living Trust by Buck Ellison (Loose Joints Publishing, 2020).
2021: Untitled by Sasha Phyars-Burgess (Capricious Publishing, New York).

Photography Catalogue of the Year winners

2014: Christopher Williams: The Production Line of Happiness and Christopher Williams: Printed in Germany by Christopher Williams (Art Institute of Chicago, 2014) and (Walther König, 2014).
2015: Diane Dufour and Xavier Barral for Images of Conviction: The Construction of Visual Evidence (Xavier Barral and Le Bal, 2015).
2016: Wojciech Zamecznik: Photo-graphics by Karolina Puchała-Rojek and Karolina Ziębińska-Lewandowska (Fundacja Archeologia Fotografii, 2015).
2017: New Realities: Photography in the 19th Century by Mattie Boom and Hans Rooseboom (Rijksmuseum and nai010, 2017).
2018: The Land in Between by Ursula Schulz-Dornburg (Mack, 2018).
2019: Enghelab Street, A Revolution through Books: Iran 1979–1983 by Hannah Darabi (Spector Books and Le Bal, 2019).
2020: Imagining Everyday Life: Engagements with Vernacular Photography by Tina M. Campt, Marianne Hirsch, Gil Hochberg, and Brian Wallis, eds. (Walther Collection and Steidl, 2020).
2021: What They Saw: Historical Photobooks by Women, 1843–1999 by Russet Lederman and Olga Yatskevich, eds. (10×10 Photobooks, New York).

References

External links

Video introduction for the 2012 awards with Chris Boot and Lesley Martin.

Photography awards
Awards established in 2012
Photography in France
Annual events in France